Mr. Desire is a 1934 Italian comedy film directed by Gennaro Righelli and starring Vittorio De Sica.

Cast
 Vittorio De Sica as Martino
 Dria Paola as Mirella
 Ada Dondini as Aunt Clarice
 Cesare Zoppetti as Store manager
 Francesco Amodio as Tobia
 María Denis
 Mara Dussia
 Pino Locchi
 Giannina Chiantoni
 Checco Rissone
 Gennaro Righelli

References

External links

1934 films
Italian comedy films
1930s Italian-language films
1934 comedy films
Italian black-and-white films
Films directed by Gennaro Righelli
1930s Italian films